Nial J. Wheate (born 1976) is an Australian pharmaceutical chemist and author at the University of Sydney.

Career
After completing high school at Copland College in Canberra, Australia, Wheate was appointed an officer in the Royal Australian Navy. He attended the Australian Defence Force Academy, where he studied for a Bachelor of Science degree double majoring in chemistry, graduating in 1997 with Honours Class I for his degree. After a short appointment as a Visiting Military Scholar, Wheate undertook a PhD under the supervision of Associate Professor J. Grant Collins within the School of Physical, Environmental and Mathematical Sciences, at University College, University of New South Wales, with a thesis "Platinum Anticancer Drugs" in 2001.

Over the next three years Wheate was posted to the School of Air Navigation (now the School of Air Combat), RAAF Base East Sale, the Air Coordination and Policy Agency, the Joint Health Support Agency and the Sea Power Centre – Australia. He left the navy in 2005. He was then appointed a Senior Fellow in the School of Biomedical and Health Sciences at the University of Western Sydney before appointment as a lecturer in medicinal chemistry in the Strathclyde Institute of Pharmacy and Biomedical Sciences at the University of Strathclyde in Glasgow, Scotland. Currently he is an Associate Professor within the Faculty of Medicine and Health University of Sydney. In 2013 he was appointed the Head of Cancer research within the Faculty of Pharmacy.
In March of 2019, Wheate was appointed to the board of Canngea Pty Ltd, an Australian medicinal cannabis manufacturer, as Science Director.

Research interests
Wheate's research interests are in the field of metal-based drugs. His research group's work includes drug design and synthesis, encapsulation of drugs in macrocyles, attachment of drugs to nanoparticles, drug solid state stability and polymorphism (materials science), drug mechanisms of action, improving drug solubility through the formation of cocrystals, drug metabolism, drug preformulation and  formulation, and drug-excipient interactions in various dosage forms. Recent highlighted work has included the development of magnetically directed drug delivery for platinum drugs.

Wheate's work has focused on multinuclear platinum-based drugs and the potential applications of cucurbiturils for drug delivery.

In 2013 Wheate was elected Fellow of the Royal Australian Chemical Institute in recognition of his achievements in cancer research  and is also a Fellow of the Higher Education Academy.

Wheate was previously an associate editor of the Australian Journal of Chemistry and is a current editor of the Source Journal of Pharmaceutical Science.

Other contributions
Wheate has also published in a variety of other areas including military justice, naval history, weapons of mass destruction and he has written a novel titled Whikatak Island.

References

External links
 Dr Nial J. Wheate

1976 births
Academics of the University of Strathclyde
Australian chemists
Graduates of the Australian Defence Force Academy
Living people
People from Melbourne
Royal Australian Navy officers
University of New South Wales alumni
Academic staff of the University of Sydney
Academic staff of Western Sydney University